The Greater London Authority Act 2007 (c 24) is an Act of the Parliament of the United Kingdom.

It gave extra powers to the Greater London Authority and the Mayor of London, which had been created by the Greater London Authority Act 1999.

References
Halsbury's Statutes,

United Kingdom Acts of Parliament 2007
Local government in London
History of local government in London
2007 in London
Acts of the Parliament of the United Kingdom concerning London
Greater London Authority